Aizu is a Japanese surname. Notable people with the surname include:

, Japanese poet, calligrapher and historian
, Japanese footballer

See also
 14701 Aizu, a main-belt asteroid

Japanese-language surnames